Piccadilly Mill, also known as Bank Top Mill or Drinkwater's Mill, owned by Peter Drinkwater, was the first cotton mill in Manchester, England, to be directly powered by a steam engine, and the 10th such mill in the world. Construction of the four-storey mill on Auburn Street started in 1789 and its 8 hp Boulton and Watt engine was installed and working by 1 May 1790. Initially the engine drove only the preparatory equipment and spinning was done manually. The mill-wright was Thomas Lowe, who had worked for William Fairbairn and helped with the planning two of Arkwright's earliest factories.

During the early 1790s the mill employed around 500 workers. Robert Owen was employed as the manager in 1792.

References

Bibliography

Textile mills in Manchester
Cotton mills
Cotton industry in England
Former textile mills in the United Kingdom
1790 establishments in England